RCOA may refer to:

 Canadian Journal of Speech-Language Pathology and Audiology / Revue canadienne d'orthophonie et d'audiologie
 Royal College of Anaesthetists, professional body for anaesthetists in the UK
 Refugee Council of Australia, advocacy body for refugees